Alice Annie Kenny (31 August 1875 – 15 May 1960) was a New Zealand poet, short-story writer and novelist. She was born in Ngāruawāhia, Waikato, on 31 August 1875.

References

1875 births
1960 deaths
New Zealand women poets
People from Ngāruawāhia
New Zealand women novelists
19th-century New Zealand novelists
20th-century New Zealand novelists
20th-century New Zealand women writers
19th-century New Zealand women writers
19th-century New Zealand poets